Michael J. Reid (born November 26, 1954 in St. Louis) is an American politician who served as a Missouri state senator and Missouri state representative.  He was elected as a Republican.  Reid attended the University of Missouri and the University of Missouri–St. Louis.

References

1954 births
Republican Party members of the Missouri House of Representatives
Living people